Alfons Schuhbeck (born on May 2, 1949) is one of Germany's top chefs, as well as being a restaurateur, celebrity chef, author and businessman.

Biography
Born Alfons Karg, he trained as a telecommunications technician, but soon became disenchanted with this profession. While playing with his band in the Bavarian holiday resort of Waging am See, he ran into the restaurateur Sebastian Schuhbeck. This man committed Alfons in a career in the hospitality business and became his mentor. Sebastian Schubeck later adopted Alfons and made him his heir.

Career
He studied at the College of Hotel Management Bad Reichenhall in Bavaria. After that he went through practical training in Salzburg, Geneva, Paris, London and Munich (in Eckart Witzigmanns three stars awarded Aubergine). He finally took the Kurhausstüberl from his mentor in 1980.

Alfons was the driving force in Sebastian Schuhbeck's business. His chef skills impressed the guests of the Kurhausstüberl in a way, that this former village inn became a favourite restaurant for the upper society of Munich and Salzburg.

In 1983 he was awarded with one star in the French Michelin Guide, as the third chef outside France at this time. The also French Gault Millau restaurant guide gave him 17 points and 3 hoods and elected him Cook of the year in 1989.

Since 1990 Schubeck has operated a catering service and supplied many first-class events like the Federal Chancellor’s celebration, the Ball des Sports and the German music industry's ECHO award ceremony.

In 2003 he established a new restaurant, the Südtiroler Stuben in Munich. There he won his second Michelin star in December 2003. In November 2005 he was awarded with the Five Star Diamond Award by the American Academy of Hospitality Sciences.

German TV-Station Bayerischer Rundfunk has broadcast his show Schuhbecks since 1993. His popularity in Germany results in this as well as publishing more than 20 books about cooking. He is also a regular guest in other German TV shows.

The lockdown resulting from the worldwide COVID-19 pandemic in 2020 and 2021 caused Schuhbeck's business to suffer. After futilely waiting for government relief to arrive, Schuhbeck eventually announced that he had filed for bankruptcy on July 18, 2021.

Scandals
In October 2022, Schuhbeck was sentenced to three years and two months in prison for tax evasion.

Businesses
At the end of the 1990s he set up Schuhbecks GmbH. This company included the restaurant Südtiroler Stuben, a wine bistro, a catering service, a cookery school, a spice shop and an ice-cream parlour, all based in Munich. Schuhbeck Check Inn GmbH was formed in 2001 to manage the Check Inn restaurant and bar in Egelsbach (south Hesse).

References

External links
 Official Website
 Alfons Schuhbeck Palazzo Munich
 Schuhbeck´s Check Inn GmbH
 Portrait über Alfons Schuhbeck
 

1949 births
Living people
People from Traunstein
German television chefs
Head chefs of Michelin starred restaurants
German chefs
German people convicted of tax crimes